A carnivore is an animal with a diet consisting primarily of meat.

Carnivore may also refer to:

 Carnivora, an order of primarily carnivorous mammals
Carnivore diet, a diet composed primarily or exclusively of meat

Business
 Carnivore (restaurant), a famous restaurant in Nairobi, Kenya
 Carnivore (software), a Federal Bureau of Investigation Ethernet tapping system

Film and television
 Carnivore, aka Beasts of Prey, a 1985 South Korean film directed by Kim Ki-young
 Carnivores (The Shield)

Games
 Carnivores (series), a series of games developed by Action Forms
 Carnivores (video game), a 1998 first-person shooter video game

Music
 Carnivores (band), an indie rock band from Atlanta, Georgia
 Carnivore (band), a thrash metal band from New York
 Carnivore (Carnivore album), 1985
 Carnivore (Body Count album), 2020
 "Carnivore" (song), a 2014 song by Starset
 "Carnivore", a song by Jewel from Picking Up the Pieces